Harry Lee Forrester (born 2 January 1991) is an English football coach and former professional footballer who played as a attacking midfielder.

Although primarily an attacking midfielder, he was deployed in a number of positions including on the left wing. He came through the youth teams of Watford and Aston Villa and would later play in the Scottish Premiership for Rangers and Kilmarnock in the Football League for Brentford, Doncaster Rovers and AFC Wimbledon. He spent the final five years of his career playing in Iran and the United States for Tractor, Machine Sazi, Orange County SC and Los Angeles Force.

He was capped at youth level at England U16 and U17 level with a combined 9 caps. He now resides in California and runs a soccer academy.

Club career

Watford
In 2000, Forrester joined Watford from Northampton Town. As Forrester was only ten years old, Watford paid Northampton £13,000 in compensation.

Aston Villa
In summer 2007, Aston Villa signed Forrester from Watford, despite reported interest from the likes of Tottenham Hotspur and Manchester United for the highly rated teen. A transfer tribunal ruled in December 2007, on the compensation due to Watford as Forrester was only 16-years-old at the time he signed for Villa. An initial fee of £250,000 was set which could have potentially risen to £1.2 million as well as a percentage of the sell-on fee. After joining, he immediately helped Villa's under-18 team to FA Premier Academy League glory in the 2007–08 season. He also started for Villa's reserve team who in the 2009–10 season, won the Reserve League South title for a third consecutive time. However, he was an unused sub as Villa went on to lose the Play-off Final against Manchester United, champions of the Reserve League North. He was released by Villa in May 2011 after his contract expired.

Kilmarnock (loan)
In August 2010, Forrester signed on loan with Scottish Premier League club Kilmarnock. He made his Scottish Premier League debut in the 2–1 win against St Mirren on 11 September. Forrester claimed his first assist in a 2–1 loss to Inverness Caledonian Thistle on 23 October, crossing to Rui Miguel who scored with a header. He played a total of eight games in all competitions for Kilmarnock, before returning to Aston Villa in January 2011.

Brentford
Despite being released by Aston Villa, there was still much speculation surrounding Forrester's future, with reported interest from Championship side Barnsley and Dutch champions Ajax. Forrester later joined up with the latter on trial, playing with their reserve side Jong Ajax, and received praise from manager Frank de Boer. He scored a hat-trick for Jong Ajax in a 5–2 pre-season victory over VV GOES on 27 July 2011.

Forrester then decided to turn down a move to Ajax to join League One club Brentford, managed by Uwe Rösler, on 4 August 2011 on a two-year contract. He made his Bees debut as an injury time substitute in the 2–1 win at Exeter City on 16 August 2011. On 30 August, he started his first game for Brentford in a 3–3 draw against Milton Keynes Dons in the first round of the Football League Trophy before being replaced by Sam Wood after 78 minutes. On 27 January 2013, Forrester earned his side a 2–2 draw and a replay against Chelsea in the fourth round of the FA Cup by converting a penalty won by Tom Adeyemi in the 73rd minute.

Doncaster Rovers
On 30 June 2013, Forrester left Brentford after his contract expired, opting instead to sign for newly promoted Championship club Doncaster Rovers. On 4 January 2014, Forrester scored his first goal for Rovers in an FA Cup third round defeat at home to Stevenage. A series of injuries restricted Forrester to just 9 appearances (seven in the League) during the 2013–14 season, of which just three were starts.

On 8 August 2015, Forrester scored a controversial goal for Rovers against Bury on the opening day of the 2015–16 season, in injury-time, after the referee ordered the ball to be passed back to the Bury keeper to restart play, Forrester accidentally volleyed the ball into Bury's goal. Doncaster manager Paul Dickov ordered his team to let Bury score an equaliser from the restart of play with Bury striker Leon Clarke allowed to walk the ball into the Doncaster goal to level the match at 1–1.

Rangers
On 31 December 2015, Forrester signed for Rangers on an initial six-month deal. Forrester said that it was a privilege to join 'one of the biggest teams in Europe' and that he wanted to stay longer than his initial six-month deal. Harry also said that he wanted to develop further as a player by learning from the more experienced players at the club, for example Lee Wallace and Kenny Miller. Forrester made his debut for Rangers on 10 January 2016 in a 5–1 win over Cowdenbeath in the Scottish Cup. On 27 February, Forrester scored his first goal for the club, netting the winner with four minutes remaining in a 1–0 league victory over St Mirren after coming on as a substitute. On 10 April while playing in the 2016 Scottish Challenge Cup Final against Peterhead, Forrester was substituted because of injury and limped off the park, it was revealed later he had suffered a hairline fracture which ultimately ended his season. However, two days later, on 12 April, he signed a new three-year contract with Rangers. On 13 June 2017, Forrester was told to stay away from training and to find a new club by Pedro Caixinha.

Tractor
In July 2018, Forrester's contract with Rangers was cancelled by mutual consent and he joined Iranian club Tractor, signing a two-year contract.

On 30 August 2018, after two appearances for Tractor, Forrester joined Tabriz rivals Machine Sazi on loan.

Move to the United States
On 18 January 2019, it was announced that Forrester was signed by USL Championship side Orange County SC ahead of the 2019 season.

During the 2022 season, Forrester was playing for NISA side Los Angeles Force.

Coaching career
Forrester announced his retirement in January 2022. Forrester owns and works for football coaching company Prospect Soccer Academy, based in California. The company provides off-season 1-to-1 training for professional players, amongst other facilities.

Career statistics

Honours
Rangers
Scottish Championship: 2015–16
Scottish Challenge Cup: 2015–16

References

External links

 Harry Forrester Interview 

1991 births
Living people
People from Milton Keynes
Footballers from Buckinghamshire
English footballers
Association football midfielders
Watford F.C. players
Aston Villa F.C. players
Kilmarnock F.C. players
Brentford F.C. players
Doncaster Rovers F.C. players
Rangers F.C. players
AFC Wimbledon players
Tractor S.C. players
Machine Sazi F.C. players
Orange County SC players
Scottish Premier League players
English Football League players
Scottish Professional Football League players
Persian Gulf Pro League players
USL Championship players
England youth international footballers
English expatriate footballers
Expatriate footballers in Iran
Expatriate soccer players in the United States
English expatriate sportspeople in Iran
English expatriate sportspeople in the United States
Los Angeles Force players
National Independent Soccer Association players